Frank Deveney (16 August 1910 – 30 October 1998) was an Australian cricketer. He played four first-class cricket matches for Victoria between 1936 and 1938.

See also
 List of Victoria first-class cricketers

References

External links
 

1910 births
1998 deaths
Australian cricketers
Victoria cricketers
Cricketers from Melbourne